In the Junkyard is the debut EP from the Potbelleez. It featured the singles "Junkyard" and "Duurty Dreemz".

Track listing
Australia CD EP
"Junkyard" (Radio Edit) – 3:00
"Duurty Dreemz" (Radio Edit) – 2:57
"Duurty Girl" (12" Mix) – 8:05
"Duurty Dreemz" (Electro Funk Lovers Mix) – 6:19
"Junkyard" (Vandalism Mix) – 6:37
"Duurty Dreemz" (Mind Electric's Not So Duurty Mix) – 8:10

Chart history
In the Junkyard first appeared on the ARIA Club Chart on 27 November 2006. Making its debut at No. 22 and eventually peaking at No. 2. It debuted at No. 23 on the ARIA dance chart before peaking later at No. 18. This was due to a performance on the finale of Big Brother Australia 2007. In the Junkyard also peaked at No. 62 and No. 12 on the ARIA Physical Singles Chart and Australian Artists Charts respectively. "Duurty Dreemz" peaked at No. 20 for two weeks on the ARIA Club Chart. "Junkyard" was featured in commercials for the Kia Soul.

References

2007 EPs
The Potbelleez albums